The 2004 GP Miguel Induráin was the 51st edition of the GP Miguel Induráin cycle race and was held on 3 April 2004. The race was won by Matthias Kessler.

General classification

References

2004
2004 in Spanish road cycling